Himmelkron is a municipality in the district of Kulmbach in Bavaria in Germany.

City arrangement

Himmelkron is arranged in the following boroughs:
 Gössenreuth
 Himmelkron
 Lanzendorf

References

Kulmbach (district)